Petrov's Flu is a 2021 crime comedy-drama film written and directed by Kirill Serebrennikov based on Alexey Salnikov's novel The Petrovs In and Around the Flu (Petrovy v grippe i vokrug nego). In June 2021, the film was selected to compete for the Palme d'Or at the 2021 Cannes Film Festival where it won the Vulcan Award for cinematography.

Plot
Petrov is an auto mechanic in post-Soviet Yekaterinburg. He is separated from his wife, a librarian, and together they have a son. Just before the start of the new year, his family gets sick with the flu. Then he meets a trickster named Igor who can mix the world of the living and the dead. The Petrov family begin to suffer surrealistic hallucinations and the line between reality and hallucination begins to disappear.

Cast
 Semyon Serzin as Petrov
Chulpan Khamatova as Nurlinsa Petrova, Petrov's estranged wife
 Vladislav Semiletkov as Petrov's son
 Yuri Kolokolnikov as Igor Artyukhin, Petrov's neighbor and the trickster. His initials in Russian spell out "Hades".
 Ivan Dorn as Sergei, Petrov's friend, and an aspiring writer
 Yuri Borisov as Sasha, Petrov's childhood friend
 Yulia Peresild as Marina, the Snow Maiden from Petrov's childhood memory
 Aleksandr Ilyin as Viktor Mikhailovich, Marina's brother
Additional credited roles were played by Husky, Timofey Tribuntsev and Marina Kleshchyova.

Production
The first plans to make a film based on Salnikov's novel were announced in May 2019, with Serebrennikov helming the project. Serebrennikov wrote the screenplay for the film while under house arrest. Filming began in October 2019, took place in Moscow and Yekaterinburg and was finished in January 2020.

The film was Ivan Dorn's first successful venture into cinema. According to Serebrennikov, "Dorn was a "wonderful dramatic artist" with "an interest in the paradoxical, energy, control of his tools, an ability to exactly recreate the image he wanted to impress on his audience, and a very deliberate approach to art." According to Dorn, he had tried and failed twice to venture into cinema, but Serebrennikov encouraged him to try once more. Dorn also announced that with this film he would conclude his musical career and begin his acting career.

Distribution was provided by Hype Production, and several French, Swiss, German and American production companies participated in the production of the film.

Reception
Petrov's Flu has an approval rating of 86% on review aggregator website Rotten Tomatoes, based on 36 reviews, and an average rating of 7.1/10. The website's critical consensus states, "A gritty Russian satire with a big, beating heart, Petrov's Flu is highly contagious". It also has a score of 79 out of 100 on Metacritic, based on 18 critics, indicating "generally favorable reviews".

2021 Golden Unicorn Awards: nominated for Best Screenplay, Best Actor, and Best Actress awards.

References

External links
 

2021 films
2020s Russian-language films
2020s crime comedy-drama films
Russian crime comedy-drama films
French crime comedy-drama films
German crime comedy-drama films
American crime comedy-drama films
2021 crime films
2021 drama films
Columbia Pictures films
Films directed by Kirill Serebrennikov
Russian avant-garde and experimental films
2020s American films
2020s avant-garde and experimental films
2020s French films